These are the profiles for the individual stages in the 2011 Vuelta a España, with Stage 12 on 1 September, and Stage 21 on 11 September.

Stage 12
1 September 2011 — Ponteareas to Pontevedra,

Stage 13
2 September 2011 — Sarria to Ponferrada,

Stage 14
3 September 2011 — Astorga to La Farrapona – Lagos de Somiedo,

Stage 15
4 September 2011 — Avilés to Angliru,

Stage 16
6 September 2011 — Villa Romana La Olmeda, Palencia to Haro,

Stage 17
7 September 2011 — Faustino V to Peña Cabarga,

Stage 18
8 September 2011 — Solares to Noja,

Stage 19
9 September 2011 — Noja to Bilbao,

Stage 20
10 September 2011 — Bilbao to Vitoria,

Stage 21
11 September 2011 — Circuito del Jarama to Madrid,

Footnotes

References

, Stage 12 To Stage 21
Vuelta a España stages